The Tijamuchi River is a river of Bolivia. It is known for its significant river dolphin (Inia geoffrensis) population.

See also
List of rivers of Bolivia

References

Rivers of Beni Department